Terrica is a rural locality in the Goondiwindi Region, Queensland, Australia. In the  Terrica had a population of 17 people.

History 
The locality takes its name from the Terrica parish name, which in turn takes its name from  early pastoral run spelt variously in the New South Wales Government Gazette as Terica, Terrea, Terren or Terrin.

Terrica was opened for selection on 17 April 1877;  were available.

In the  Terrica had a population of 17 people.

References 

Goondiwindi Region
Localities in Queensland